Bernat Fenollar, also Mossèn (Bernat de) Fenollar (Penàguila, Valencian Community, 1438 – Valencia, 28 February 1516) was a poet, cleric and chess player from Valencia, Spain. He was an abbot (the title "Mossèn" was often given to clergymen), had a position both in Valencia Cathedral and the University of Valencia as a professor of mathematics.

Works

Scachs d'amor

He is one of the authors of Scachs d'amor or Chess of Love, a poem based on a chess game between Francesc de Castellví and Narcís Vinyoles,  while Bernat Fenollar comments and establishes the rules. It is the first documented game played with the modern rules of chess, at least concerning the moves of the queen and bishop.

Selected works
 Història de la passió de N.S. Jesu Christi en cobles, Valencia: 1493 
 Lo procés de les olives, Valencia: 1497 
 Les trobes en lahors de la Verge Maria, Valencia: 1974 , 
 The poem Scachs d'amor (1475), Murcia: 2015 , 
 Source: WorldCat

References

External links
 Bernat Fenollar on Gran enciclopèdia catalana.

Spanish chess players
Spanish clergy
Spanish Roman Catholics
15th-century Spanish poets
1438 births
1516 deaths
15th century in chess
Spanish male poets
Spanish chess writers